The MacCarthy Reagh (Irish: Mac Cárthaigh Riabhach) dynasty are a branch of the MacCarthy dynasty, Kings of Desmond, deriving from the Eóganacht Chaisil sept.

History
The Mac Cárthaigh Riabhach seated themselves as kings of Carbery in what is now southwestern County Cork including Rosscarbery in the 13th century. Their primary allies in the initially small territory itself were O'Donovans, and members of the Ui Chairpre; both were recent arrivals, gaining their lands from the O'Mahonys of Eóganacht Raithlind and the O'Driscolls of Corcu Loígde. The historical record for this period is very confused and a precise sequence of events cannot be reconstructed. A portion of Carbery was conquered around 1232 by Donal Gott MacCarthy, King of Desmond, from whom the dynasty descend. His son Donal Maol Mac Carthaigh, was the first ruler of the new principality. Their descendants would expand their territories considerably and forge a small, wealthy kingdom distinct and independent from the larger Kingdom of Desmond, as well as largely independent from the Earldom of Desmond and from England, which would last into the early-mid 17th century.

Fínghin Mac Carthaigh, the victor for Gaelic Desmond in the Battle of Callann and other campaigns, is considered to belong to the Mhic Carthaigh Riabhach, being a son of Donal Gott. They were in frequent conflict with the line of the MacCarthy Mor, and the MacCarthys of Duhallow and Coshmaine, all of which were generally in conflict with the Fitzgeralds and FitzMaurices which comprised the lines of the Earl of Desmond and the Earl of Kildare, respectively.

The dynasty became very successful during the 14th to 16th centuries, accumulating great wealth and possessing what was at times the most formidable, although not the largest army in the Desmond region. MacCarthy Reagh princes such as Florence MacCarthy were highly active in the politics and wars of Munster. A later branch from Bansha, County Tipperary, descendants of Donal of the Pipes, would relocate to Toulouse in France and be created the Counts MacCarthy Reagh of Toulouse (Comtes de Mac-Carthy Reagh). The renowned Jesuit preacher Nicholas Tuite MacCarthy was from this line. From another branch of the dynasty descended several more lines of counts and viscounts in France.

Florence MacCarthy was the compiler of Mac Carthaigh's Book, and the Book of Lismore was commissioned by an earlier member of the dynasty.

The controversial Blessed Thaddeus McCarthy is believed to have belonged to the MacCarthys Reagh.

The line of the Mac Carthaigh Riabhach was not represented among the Gaelic nobility of Ireland granted courtesy recognition.

Princes of Carbery
Claimants to the title of Prince of Carbery have included:
 Donal Gott MacCarthy – King of Desmond and founder of the dynasty
 Fínghin Mac Carthaigh, King of Desmond – victor at the Battle of Callann
 Donal Maol MacCarthy, 1st Prince of Carbery – 1st Sovereign Prince of Carbery
 Donal Caomh MacCarthy, 2nd Prince of Carbery
 Donal Cairbreach MacCarthy, 3rd Prince of Carbery – eldest son of Donal Caomh
 Cormac Donn MacCarthy, 4th Prince of Carbery – second son of Donal Caomh, and ancestor of the Dunmanway branch
 Donal Reagh MacCarthy, 5th Prince of Carbery – a quo MacCarthy Reagh, son of Donal Cairbreach
Donal Glas MacCarthy Reagh, 6th Prince of Carbery – eldest son of Donal Reagh
 Donogh of Iniskean MacCarthy Reagh, 7th Prince of Carbery – second surviving son of Donal Reagh
 Dermod an Duna MacCarthy Reagh, 8th Prince of Carbery – third surviving son of Donal Reagh
Cormac MacCarthy Reagh, 9th Prince of Carbery – son of Donogh of Iniskean
 Finghin MacCarthy Reagh, 10th Prince of Carbery – commissioner of the Book of Lismore, eldest son of Dermod an Duna
Dermod MacCarthy Reagh, 11th Prince of Carbery – second son of Dermod an Duna
 Donal MacCarthy Reagh, 12th Prince of Carbery – Dermod's nephew, the son of Finghin
 Cormac na Haoine MacCarthy Reagh, 13th Prince of Carbery – eldest son of Donal
Finghin MacCarthy Reagh, 14th Prince of Carbery – second son of Donal
Donogh MacCarthy Reagh, 15th Prince of Carbery – third son of Donal
Florence MacCarthy
Owen MacCarthy Reagh, 16th Prince of Carbery – fourth son of Donal

 Donal na Pipi, 17th Prince of Carbery – son of Cormac na Haoine, last Prince of Carbery
 Cormac MacCarthy Reagh
 Donal MacCarthy Reagh, "Comte de Carbery" & Lord of Kilbrittain m. Lady Ellen Roche of Fermoy
 possibly Col. Finghin MacCarthy Reagh, "Comte Mac Carthy-Reagh" (1625-1676) m. Mary
 Cormac
 Owen (1691-1775)
 Cormac m. Catherine Bernard
 Francis Bernard MacCarthy Reagh, from whom the "Longfield MacCarthys" stem.
 Dermot (1658-1728)
 Donal I MacCarthy Reagh of Gorteenasowna (1690-1758) m. Katherine O'Driscoll
 Donal II MacCarthy (1735-1814) m. Anna MacCarthy Reagh of Gortnascreeny
 Daniel Carty of Cashloura, from whom the McCarthys of Drinagh
 Cormac McCarty Esq. (d. 1792)
 Owen MacCarthy
 Margaret m. Richard O'Neill of Kilmichael, Prince of Ulster (1743-1817)
 Cormac, Lord of Kilbrittain (d. 1667) m. Ellen McCarthy Mor
 Daniel MacCarthy Reagh (1628-1691)
 Catherine
 Ellen
 Donough
 Owen (d. 1641)
 Catherine
 Owen, a quo the Springhouse sept
 Donough, Proprietor of Kilbrittain
 Finghin of Bandubh
 Ellen
 Julia
 Teige, Chief of Kilgobane

MacCarthy Glas/Duna
As patrilineal descendants of the 4th Prince, but not the 5th Prince, the MacCarthys of Dunmanway, belonging to the MacCarthy Glas and MacCarthy Duna septs, are not technically MacCarthys Reagh. However, most historians and genealogists refer to all descendants of Donal Gott as MacCarthys Reagh, and it is the case that, should the "senior line", descendants of the 5th Prince, fail, then the MacCarthys of Dunmanway would become the "new" Princes of Carbery.

 Teige-an-Fhorsa MacCarthy, Lord of Glean-na-Chroim
 Teige-an-Duna MacCarthy, Lord of Glean-na-Chroim – ancestor of several surviving septs

See also

 Walter Butler, 11th Earl of Ormond – grandson of Cormac na Haoine, 10th Prince
 Donal II O'Donovan – relative through marriage, inaugurated by father-in-law Owen, 12th Prince
 Sir Fineen O'Driscoll – also son-in-law of Owen, 12th Prince
 De Barry family – neighbouring family of Welsh-Norman origin, but with whom the MacCarthys Reagh maintained generally good relations
 Muskerry West and Muskerry East, baronies in central Cork that were part of the Tudor period principality of Carbery.
 Francis MacCarthy Willis Bund – a descendant of Donal Reagh MacCarthy (d. 1414), The MacCarthy Reagh, of Kilbrittain Castle
 Château MacCarthy, a French wine created by the dynasty

Notes

References

 Butler, W. F. T., "The Barony of Carbery", in Journal of the Cork Historical and Archaeological Society Volume X, Second Series. 1904. pp. 1–10, 73–84.
 Butler, W. F. T., Gleaning from Irish History. Longman, Green & Co. 1925.
 Carroll, Michael J. and Alan Langford (illus.), The Castles and Fortified Houses of West Cork. Bantry Design Studios. 2001.
 D'Alton, John, Illustrations, Historical and Genealogical, of King James's Irish Army List, 1689. 2 vols. London: J.R. Smith. 2nd edition, 1861.
 Duffy, Seán (ed.), Medieval Ireland: An Encyclopedia. Routledge. 2005.
 Ellis, Peter Berresford, Erin's Blood Royal: The Gaelic Noble Dynasties of Ireland. Palgrave. Revised edition, 2002.
 "Emma Cavendish" (short story, original author unknown), in The Last of the O'Mahonys, and other Historical Tales of the English Settlers in Munster. London: Richard Bentley. 1843.
 FitzPatrick, Elizabeth, Royal Inauguration in Gaelic Ireland c. 1100–1600: A Cultural Landscape Study. Boydell Press. 2004.
 Lyons, J., and H. W. Gillman, "Togher Castle and District, County Cork", in Journal of the Cork Historical and Archaeological Society, Volume I, Second Series. 1895. pp. 481–97.
 MacCarthy Glas, Daniel, The Life and Letters of Florence MacCarthy. 1867.
 MacCarthy, Samuel Trant, The MacCarthys of Munster. 1922.
 O'Donovan, John (ed. and tr.), Annála Ríoghachta Éireann. Annals of the Kingdom of Ireland by the Four Masters. 7 vols. Royal Irish Academy. Dublin. 1848–51. 2nd edition, 1856.
 O'Hart, John, Irish Pedigrees. Dublin. 5th edition, 1892.
 Moody, Terry (2011). A New History of Ireland. A Companion to Irish History. Oxford University Press. p. 157.
 Ó hInnse, Séamus (ed. and tr.) and Florence MacCarthy, Mac Carthaigh's Book, or Miscellaneous Irish Annals (A.D. 1114–1437). Dublin Institute for Advanced Studies. 1947.
 O'Keeffe, Eugene (ed. and tr.), Eoganacht Genealogies from the Book of Munster. Cork. 1703. available here
 Ó Murchadha, Diarmuid, "The Battle of Callan, A.D. 1261", in Journal of the Cork Historical and Archaeological Society, Vol. LXVI, No. 204. July–December 1961. pp. 105–116.
 Ó Murchadha, Diarmuid, Family Names of County Cork. Cork: The Collins Press. 2nd edition, 1996.

MacCarthy dynasty